Wen Chao (Chinese:文超; Pinyin: Wén Chāo; born 16 January 1987) is a Chinese football player who currently plays for Chinese club Dalian LFTZ Huayi.

Club career
Wen joined Changsha Ginde youth team system in the early year and was promoted to first team squad in 2007. He was loaned to China League Two side Hunan Billows for gaining match experiences in the 2008 league season. When he returned to Changsha Ginde in 2009, Wen began to have a change to play in the Super League. On 12 April 2010, he made his Super League debut in a 2–1 home victory against Tianjin TEDA, coming on as a substitute for Kim Eun-Jung in the 72nd minute. He played 9 league matches without scoring a goal in the 2010 league season. Wen didn't make any appearance in the 2010 league season as Changsha Ginde finished the bottom of the league and relegation to China League One. In February 2011, the club moved to Shenzhen as the club's name changed into Shenzhen Phoenix, Wen chose to stay in the club. On 5 May, Wen scored his first goal for the team in a 2011 Chinese FA Cup match which Shenzhen Phoenix beat Shenyang Dongjin 3–0. His first league goal for the club came on 25 June, in a 2–0 away victory against Shenyang Dongjin. The club were bought by Chinese property developers Guangzhou R&F and moved to Guangzhou in June and won promotion back to the Super League at the first attempt. Wen scored 4 goals in 13 appearances in the 2011 league season.

In March 2015, Wen transferred to China League Two side Baoding Yingli ETS.

Career statistics 
Statistics accurate as of match played 31 December 2019.

References

1987 births
Living people
Chinese footballers
Association football forwards
Footballers from Shenyang
Changsha Ginde players
Guangzhou City F.C. players
Hunan Billows players
Baoding Yingli Yitong players
Taizhou Yuanda F.C. players
Chinese Super League players
China League One players
China League Two players